Worawut Saengampa (born 23 December 1992) is a Thai boccia player who represented Thailand at the 2016 and 2020 Summer Paralympics. He, along with his 3 teammates, won a gold medal in Boccia in the Mixed Team BC1–2 event. He also won another silver medal in the individual event.

References

External links
 

1992 births
Living people
Worawut Saengampa
Worawut Saengampa
Worawut Saengampa
Worawut Saengampa
Paralympic medalists in boccia
Medalists at the 2016 Summer Paralympics
Medalists at the 2020 Summer Paralympics
Boccia players at the 2016 Summer Paralympics
Boccia players at the 2020 Summer Paralympics
Sportspeople with cerebral palsy